is a railway station in the city of Sano, Tochigi, Japan, operated by the private railway operator Tōbu Railway. The station is numbered "TI-37".

Lines

Station layout
Tanuma Station consists of one island platform, connected to the station building by an underground passage.

Platforms

Adjacent stations

History
Tanuma Station opened on 20 March 1894.

From 17 March 2012, station numbering was introduced on all Tōbu lines, with Tanuma Station becoming "TI-37".

Passenger statistics
In fiscal 2019, the station was used by an average of 979 passengers daily (boarding passengers only).

Surrounding area
 Tanuma Post Office
Karasawayama Jinja
former Tanuma town hall

See also
 List of railway stations in Japan

References

External links

 Tobu station information 
	

Tobu Sano Line
Stations of Tobu Railway
Railway stations in Tochigi Prefecture
Railway stations in Japan opened in 1894
Sano, Tochigi